Martin Lynch is a playwright and theatre director from Belfast.

Life
Martin Lynch was born in Gilnahirk, Belfast in 1950. He left school at 15 and became a cloth cutter until 1969, when he became a full time organiser for the Republican Clubs. In 1976, he organised a tour of community centres with John Arden’s Non-Stop Connolly Show. This inspired Lynch to write plays himself.

Work
He co-founded the Turf Lodge Fellowship Community Theatre in 1976. Over the next five years, he wrote a series of plays including We Want Work, We Want Bread (1977), They’re Taking Down the Barricades, What About Your Ma is Your Da Still Workin’?, and Roof Under Our Heads.

He then worked as writer in residence with the Lyric Theatre (Belfast). His most famous play produced there was Dockers (1981), a recreation of working class life in Belfast’s Sailortown district. This was followed by The Interrogation of Ambrose Fogarty (1982), Castles in the Air (1983), and Minstrel Boys (1985). Lynch's plays have been performed throughout Ireland and in the UK, Europe and the USA.

Lynch has also been co-ordinator of the Northern Ireland Community Arts Forum since 1998.

Published plays
 The Interrogation of Ambrose Fogarty & Castles in the Air by Martin Lynch (Blackstaff Press)
 Lay Up Your Ends by Martin Lynch (Lagan Press)
 The History of the Troubles (accordin' to my Da) by Martin Lynch, Conor Grimes & Alan McKee (Lagan Press)
 Pictures of Tomorrow & Rinty by Martin Lynch (Lagan Press)
 Dockers & Welcome to Bladonmore Road by Martin Lynch Lagan Press)
 Chronicles of Long Kesh by Martin Lynch (Oberon Books)

Awards
 2020: Elected member of Aosdána

References

Irish dramatists and playwrights
Irish theatre directors
Writers from Belfast
Living people
1950 births